Carlo Giustini (born 4 May 1923), sometimes credited as Carlo Justini, is an Italian retired actor.

Life and career 
Born in Viterbo, the son of a railway employee, Giustini debuted at twenty years old in The Materassi Sisters, after having been chosen through an audition. In the postwar years he was very active in the sentimental and adventurous genres, in which he usually played secondary and supporting roles. He was also cast in several international productions, mainly thanks to his perfect English. He retired from acting shortly after having appeared in two sci-fi films directed back-to-back by Antonio Margheriti in 1965, Wild, Wild Planet and War of the Planets.

Selected filmography 

 La donna della montagna (1944) - Un giovane montanaro
 The Materassi Sisters (1944) - L'amante della principessa russa
 Fantasmi del mare (1948) - Sergente Banti
 Anthony of Padua (1949) - Padre di Ferdinando
 Alarm Bells (1949) - Marco
 Children of Chance (1949) - Marco
 Rapture (1950)
 Love and Blood (1951) - Paolo Giaccone - un Camorrista
 Shadows Over Naples (1951) - Paolo Giaccone - ein Camorrista
 Tragic Serenade (1951) - don Peppino
 Mamma Mia, What an Impression! (1951) - Arturo
 The Legend of the Piave (1952) - Conte Riccardo Dolfin
 Der bunte Traum (1952) - Pattoni
 Beauties on Motor Scooters (1952) - Alberto
 Sins of Rome (1953) - Artorige
 Prisoner in the Tower of Fire (1953) - Marco Pepli
 Nero and the Burning of Rome (1953) - Britannico
 Three Coins in the Fountain (1954)
 Knights of the Queen (1954)
 I cavalieri dell'illusione (1954)
 La sultana Safiyè (1955)
 La ragazza di via Veneto (1955)
 The Baby and the Battleship (1956) - First Vespucci Brother
 The Passionate Stranger (1957) - Carlo / Mario
 La trovatella di Pompei (1957) - Roberto Ventura
 The Silent Enemy (1958) - Fellini
 Intent to Kill (1958) - Francisco Flores
 The Whole Truth (1958) - Leading Man
 The Naked Maja (1958) - José
 The Siege of Pinchgut (1959) - Luke 
 Messalina (1960) - Lusio Geta
 The Savage Innocents (1960) - Second Trooper
 Mistress of the World (1960) - Seemann John
 World in My Pocket (1961) - Pierre
 Amazons of Rome (1961) - Bruto
 The Story of Joseph and His Brethren (1961) - Reuben, Joseph's Brother
 El Cid (1961) - Bermúdez
 Barabbas (1961) - Officer
 La tragica notte di Assisi (1960) - Francesco d'Assisi
 Pontius Pilate (1962) - Decio
 Damon and Pythias (1962) - Cariso
 Between Shanghai and St. Pauli (1962) - Carlos
 I Don Giovanni della Costa Azzurra (1962) - Capitano Yacht
 Wild, Wild Planet (1966) - Ken, Lieutenant
 War of the Planets (1966) - Ken (final film role)

References

External links 
 

1923 births 
Possibly living people
20th-century Italian male actors
Italian male film actors 
People from Viterbo
People of Lazian descent